Steve Johnson was the defending champion and successfully defended his title, defeating Tennys Sandgren in the final, 7–6(7–2), 2–6, 6–4.

Seeds
The top four seeds received a bye into the second round.

Draw

Finals

Top half

Bottom half

Qualifying

Seeds

Qualifiers

Qualifying draw

First qualifier

Second qualifier

Third qualifier

Fourth qualifier

References
Main draw
Qualifying draw

Singles